Gocław (German ′′Gotzlow′′) is a part of the city of Szczecin, Poland. It is  located on the left bank of the Oder river, north of the Szczecin Old Town and Middle Town.

History 
Before 1945, when Stettin was a part of Germany (Pomerania), the German name of this suburb was Stettin-Gotzlow. The place became well known since  a huge Bismarck tower had been built on top of  a hill in the vicinity of  the river Oder.

See also 

 Szczecin Bismarck tower
 Szczecin

References 

Neighbourhoods of Szczecin